

List of Ambassadors

Shlomo Cohen 2003-2009
Arie Tenne 1999 - 2003
Yosef Hasseen 1995 - 1999
Herzl Inbar 1991 - 1995
Chanan Olami 1987 - 1991
Moshe Liba 1978
Hagai Dikan 1977 - 1978
Victor Eliachar 1974 - 1977
Yosef Shofman 1971-1974
Jacob Doron 1967 - 1971
Eliashiv Ben-Horin 1963 - 1967
Arie Oron 1960 - 1963
Moshe Avidan 1958 - 1960
Ambassador Arie Aroch 1957 - 1958
Minister David Shaltiel (Non-Resident, Brasilia) 1952 - 1956

References

Venezuela
Israel